Aasmund Nordstoga (born 26 August 1964) is a Norwegian musician, singer and composer from Vinje, Telemark. He made his solo debut in 2009 with the album Ein , an album for which he was nominated for the Spellemannsprisen award. He released the record Livet er godt with lyrics by Aasmund Olavsson Vinje being a collaboration with his younger brother, Odd Nordstoga,

Aasmund Nordstoga comes from a musical family. His mother, Ellen is a folk singer and his father, Olav Nordstoga is a folk singer, lyricist, and causer. He is also related to Kåre Nordstoga, a musician from Notodden.

He received the Nynorsk User of the Year award in 2014.

Discography

Albums

References

1964 births
Living people
Norwegian folk musicians
Norwegian male singers
Norwegian songwriters
People from Vinje